A mihbaj is a traditional Bedouin implement, made of a wooden base with a foot-long pestle, that serves both as a coffee grinder and as a percussion instrument. It is one of the few instruments used in Bedouin music.

Arabic musical instruments
Idiophones
Coffee preparation